John B. Gripon (1809–1847) was a Liberian pastor, legislator, and judge.

Gripon was born free in South Carolina, United States, in 1809. He was literate, and before emigrating to Liberia, he worked as a carpenter. In 1840, he was elected to the colonial legislature of Liberia representing Monrovia.

On July 26, 1847, Gripon was one of eleven signers of the Liberian Declaration of Independence. That same year, he served briefly as a judge for Montserrado County, head of the Methodist Conference Liberia Seminary, and a member of the Senate of Liberia for two months prior to his death.

References

1809 births
1847 deaths
Liberian Methodists
People from South Carolina
Politicians from Monrovia
Liberian judges
Members of the Senate of Liberia
American emigrants to Liberia
Signatories of the Liberian Declaration of Independence